Suspended Sunrise Recordings is an independent record label based in San Diego, California. The label was created by Aaron Rodgers of the Green Bay Packers and co-founded by Ryan Zachary in 2009, but Suspended Sunrise officially became active when signing the first band, The Make, in May 2011.

The label released The Make's debut single, "Get It", with the video for the song on June 30, 2011. The video was directed by Murphy Karges of Sugar Ray and was shot in a Northern California bowling alley near Rodgers' and Zachary's hometown of Chico, California. The video, which featured dancing cops, showgirls, Jimmy Richards of Brighten on drums, and a cameo by both Rodgers and Zachary, caught the attention of ESPN and several other news outlets, drawing approximately 38,000 views on YouTube in the first 30 days of release.

In October 2011, Suspended Sunrise Recordings announced that Murphy Karges has been named the president of Suspended Sunrise Recordings.

References

External links 
 
 Twitter

American independent record labels